Grishayev or Grishaev is a Russian masculine surname, its feminine counterpart is Grishayeva or Grishaeva. It may refer to
Boris Grishayev (1930–1999), Russian marathon runner 
Nadezhda Grishaeva (born 1989), Russian basketball player
Nonna Grishayeva (born 1971), Russian actress

Russian-language surnames